Alaa Kamal is an Egyptian professional football player. He started his career with Al-Mokawloon al-Arab. Before the start of the 2008/2009 season he signed with El Zamalek, he returned to Al-Mokawloon al-Arab after one season, and stay there for 3 seasons from 2009 to 2012, before he joined Al-Ittihad Al-Sakndary in 2013.

References

External links
 

1985 births
Living people
Al Mokawloon Al Arab SC players
Zamalek SC players
FC Masr players
Egyptian footballers
Association footballers not categorized by position
Al Ittihad Alexandria Club players
Egyptian Premier League players